= Pirrho Musefili =

Italian cryptographer

Pirrho Musefili (fl. 1546 - 1557) was a Florentine cryptographer and cryptanalyst. He solved cyphers and cryptograms for clients, notable clients being the King of England, King Henry II of France, the Duke of Alba, and the powerful of Denmark.

Due to Musefili and his student (and called his successor) Camilo Giusti's wide area of service for cryptography, they have been noted as important for the expansion of cryptology outside of Italy.
